Adrastea, Adrasteia, Adrestea or Adrestia may refer to:
 Adrasteia or Adrestia (mythology)

 Adrastea (moon), the second of Jupiter's known moons
 Adrastea, an informal name borne by Jupiter XII (now Ananke (moon)) from 1955 to 1975
 Adrastea: Events and Characters of the 18th Century, a literary work by Johann Gottfried Herder
 239 Adrastea, an asteroid
 Adrasteia (Mysia), a region in northwest Asia Minor